Silver Run is a  long tributary to Delaware Bay in New Castle County, Delaware.  Silver Run is tidal for most of its course and drains a large part of Augustine Wildlife Area.

See also
List of Delaware rivers

References

External links
Silver Run Tract of Augustine Wildlife Area

Rivers of Delaware
Rivers of New Castle County, Delaware
Tributaries of Delaware Bay